The following events occurred in March 1903:

March 1, 1903 (Sunday)
The Ligue nationaliste canadienne is founded in Quebec, Canada, by Henri Bourassa and Olivar Asselin.
23-year-old Hugh Guthrie Leighton, an electrical engineering student at the Armour Institute and former college football player at the University of Chicago, dies of dilation of the heart at his father's home in Chicago. His health had never recovered after he collapsed following a Thanksgiving 1902 football game.

March 2, 1903 (Monday)

In New York City, the Martha Washington Hotel, the first hotel exclusively for women, opens at 29 East 29th Street in Manhattan.

March 3, 1903 (Tuesday)
The British Admiralty announces plans to build a naval base at Rosyth, in the Firth of Forth.
The Baker valve gear for steam locomotives is patented for the first time, in the United States.

March 4, 1903 (Wednesday)
The 58th United States Congress assembles in Washington, D.C.
Beşiktaş J.K. football club is formed in modern-day Turkey.
Born: Dorothy Mackaill, British-born US actress, in Sculcoates (died 1990)

March 5, 1903 (Thursday)
The Ottoman Empire and the German Empire sign an agreement to build the Constantinople–Baghdad Railway.
Died: Gaston Paris, 63, French writer and Nobel Prize nominee

March 6, 1903 (Friday)

March 7, 1903 (Saturday)

March 8, 1903 (Sunday)
The funeral of Charles Gavan Duffy, former Premier of Victoria, takes place at Glasnevin Cemetery in Dublin.

March 9, 1903 (Monday)
Elizabeth Milbank Anderson is identified as the donor of $1,000,000 to Barnard College, a women's college in New York, United States.

March 10, 1903 (Tuesday)
Born:  Bix Beiderbecke, jazz musician (died 1931), in Davenport, Iowa

March 11, 1903 (Wednesday)
Born: Ronald Syme, New Zealand classical scholar and historian, in Eltham (died 1989)

March 12, 1903 (Thursday)
The University of Puerto Rico is officially founded.

March 13, 1903 (Friday)
Having abolished the Sokoto Caliphate in West Africa, the new British administration accepts the concession of the last Vizier of the Caliphate and appoints Muhammadu Attahiru II as the new Caliph.

March 14, 1903 (Saturday)
The Hay–Herrán Treaty, granting the United States the right to build the Panama Canal, is ratified by the United States Senate. The Colombian Senate later rejects the treaty.
Born: 
Mustafa Barzani, Kurdish military leader, in Barzan, Iraq (died 1979)
Adolph Gottlieb, US abstract expressionist painter, sculptor and printmaker, in New York City (died 1974)

March 15, 1903 (Sunday)

March 16, 1903 (Monday)

March 17, 1903 (Tuesday)

March 18, 1903 (Wednesday)
Born: Galeazzo Ciano, Italian politician, in Livorno (died 1944)

March 19, 1903 (Thursday)
Died: Pista Dankó, 44, Hungarian Romani bandleader and composer (lung disease)

March 20, 1903 (Friday)
Died: Charles Godfrey Leland, 78, US humorist, writer, and folklorist

March 21, 1903 (Saturday)

March 22, 1903 (Sunday)

March 23, 1903 (Monday)
The Wright brothers file a patent application based on the design of their Glider No. 3.

March 24, 1903 (Tuesday)
Born: Frank Sargeson, New Zealand writer, in Hamilton, as Norris Frank Davey (died 1982)

March 25, 1903 (Wednesday)
The Alaska boundary dispute is decided by arbitration, in favour of the United States.
The football club Racing Club de Avellaneda is founded in Buenos Aires, Argentina.

March 26, 1903 (Thursday)

March 27, 1903 (Friday)

March 28, 1903 (Saturday)

March 29, 1903 (Sunday)

March 30, 1903 (Monday)

March 31, 1903 (Tuesday)

New Zealand inventor Richard Pearse is believed to have made a short, uncontrolled flight in a powered heavier-than-air machine.

References

1903
1903-03
1903-03